George Kokinis (born February 27, 1967) is a former general manager of the Cleveland Browns.  As director of pro personnel for the Baltimore Ravens the previous five seasons, Kokinis was responsible for analyzing NFL rosters and assessing the free agent market.  He also assisted in contract negotiation for some of the team's draft picks.  Before entering the pro personnel department, Kokinis served as the team's northeast area scout (1996–1999)  He started his NFL scouting career in 1991 with the Cleveland Browns, after an internship with the team's operations department.

A native of Wethersfield, Connecticut, Kokinis earned a degree in psychology from Hobart College and a master's degree in sports management from the University of Richmond where he served as a graduate assistant for the school's baseball team.  At Hobart, Kokinis played both football and baseball.  Kokinis is married and has three children.

Prior to the 2009 season, Kokinis was hired as general manager. But after a 1–7 start, Kokinis was reportedly escorted from the Cleveland Browns team facility by security on November 2, 2009. The team later released a statement saying he was "no longer actively involved with the organization."

On June 1, 2010, George Kokinis returned to the Ravens as a personnel assistant to Ozzie Newsome.

References

1967 births
Living people
Baltimore Ravens executives
Cleveland Browns executives
National Football League general managers
Hobart and William Smith Colleges alumni
University of Richmond alumni
People from Wethersfield, Connecticut